Elitsa Vasileva (Bulgarian Cyrillic: Елица Василева; born 13 May 1990 in Dupnitsa) is an international volleyball player from Bulgaria.

Career

She has represented CSKA Sofia and also played in the Italian, Brazilian, South Korean, and Turkish top-level leagues. In December 2013, during her time in South Korea, Vasileva achieved 57 points in a single match, setting a world record.

National team

Vasileva has on many occasions served as captain of the team.

 2012 Women's European Volleyball League -  Runner-Up, with Bulgaria (she also won the best spiker and best scorer individual awards).
 2013 Women's European Volleyball League -  Third place, with Bulgaria
2021 Women's European Volleyball League, winning a gold medal.

Clubs
  CSKA Sofia (2005–2007)
  Esperia Cremona (2007–2009)
  Sirio Perugia (2009–2010)
  Zanetti Bergamo (2010–2012)
  Vôlei Amil/Campinas (2012–2013)
  Incheon Heungkuk Life Pink Spiders (2013–2014)
  Vakıfbank İstanbul (2014–2015)
  Dinamo Kazan (2015–2018)
  Pallavolo Scandicci (2018-2019)
  Igor Gorgonzola Novara (2019-2020)
  Pallavolo Scandicci (2020-2021)

References

External links
 

1990 births
Living people
Bulgarian women's volleyball players
People from Dupnitsa
European Games competitors for Bulgaria
Volleyball players at the 2015 European Games
Outside hitters
Expatriate volleyball players in Italy
Expatriate volleyball players in Brazil
Expatriate volleyball players in South Korea
Expatriate volleyball players in Turkey
Expatriate volleyball players in Russia
Bulgarian expatriates in Italy
Bulgarian expatriate sportspeople in Turkey
Bulgarian expatriates in Russia
Serie A1 (women's volleyball) players
Sportspeople from Kyustendil Province